Christian Colombo (born 24 April 1968) is a Swiss former professional footballer who played as a midfielder.

Honours
FC Sion
Swiss Cup: 1995–96

References

1968 births
Living people
Sportspeople from Lugano
Swiss men's footballers
Association football midfielders
Switzerland international footballers
Swiss Super League players
FC Lugano players
FC Sion players